Cambridge F.C. may refer to:
 Cambridge United F.C., a professional football club from England in League One
 Cambridge City F.C., a semi-professional football club from England in the regional Isthmian League  
 Cambridge FC, a semi-professional football club from New Zealand
 Cambridge F.C. (Glasgow), a 19th-century football club in the 1885–86 Scottish Cup

See also 
 Cambridge University A.F.C., football club
 Cambridge University R.U.F.C., rugby club